KRAC (1370 AM) is an American radio station broadcasting a talk radio format. Licensed to Red Bluff, California, United States, the station is currently owned by Independence Rock Media Group.

KRAC signed on the air in 1963 under the call letters KQCY (K-Quincy).  The FCC granted the license for the 1370 AM frequency for daytime operation only at a paltry 500 watts (to protect the signal of KEEN, in San Jose, which was a 5,000 watt station also on 1370).  KQCY was allowed to sign on at 6:00 am, but had to sign off at sunset (in winter, that meant the station went off the air at 4:45 pm).

KQCY originally used a modified RCA transmitter that had been used on a naval ship during World War II.  The studios and transmitter were located in East Quincy behind a bowling alley.

In the late 1960s, the call letters were changed to KPCO (K-Plumas County).  In the early to mid-1970s KPCO reached its greatest success.

In 1976, the station moved to new state of the art studios in downtown Quincy, and a new 5,000 watt transmitter was installed at the old site.  From 6:00 am to 8:00 am, local host Andy Anderson, who was also Quincy’s Fire Chief, hosted a country music program.  The rest of the day, programmed by Stan Castles who had large market radio experience in Texas, KPCO became a tightly formatted Top 40 radio station.  Personalities who went on to radio careers elsewhere included Chris Marker and Steve Rusk.  KPCO was also the primary source for daily news in Plumas County.  A half-hour local newscast was broadcast each morning from 8:00 to 8:30, with a live call in talk show “People's Dialogue” from 8:30 to 9:00.  There were hourly newscasts throughout the day with extended news programs at noon and 4:00 PM.  News directors included Tom Guarino and Dan Adams, who went on to KHSL-TV in Chico, California and eventually on to KXTV, News10 in Sacramento for 27 years.

In the early 1980s, KPCO was granted a license to broadcast full-time, and its commitment to Plumas County expanded as its signal strength increased to include much of the county.  In the 1990s, longtime owner Ralph Wittick sold KPCO, which began a slow decline.  As other radio stations signed on the air in Plumas County, KPCO was no longer the only choice.  By the late 1990s, KPCO abandoned music and adopted a conservative talk show format.  After a series of changes in ownership, KPCO went off the air in 2007.

According to FCC records, the station went temporarily silent in 2007 due to financial problems.  The station changed its call sign from KPCO to KRAC on August 28, 2009.

Popular culture
"KRAC" was referenced in the June 21, 2007 episode of Studio 60 on the Sunset Strip as being a talk radio station with a pair of right wing morning hosts. At the time, "KRAC" represented a non-existent station, more than two years before that radio callsign was taken over by the station that currently occupies it.

External links

RAC
Radio stations established in 1963
1963 establishments in California